Draytonville is an unincorporated community in Cherokee County, South Carolina, United States. It lies near the city of Gaffney.

References

Unincorporated communities in South Carolina
Unincorporated communities in Cherokee County, South Carolina